Druviena Parish is an administrative unit of Gulbene Municipality (prior to the 2009 administrative reforms the Gulbene District), Latvia.

Towns, villages and settlements of Druviena parish

See also

References 

Parishes of Latvia
Gulbene Municipality